Maurice-Arthur-Alphonse Wemaere (1879-1956) was a French colonel who commanded the French 1st Cavalry Brigade during the Battle of Belgium and the Battle of France.

References 
^ Pettibone, Charles D. (2010). The Organization and Order of Battle of Militaries in World War II: VOLUME VI ITALY and FRANCE Including the Neutral Countries of San Marino, Vatican. Trafford Publishing. p. 483. .

^ Doughty, Robert A. (2014). The Breaking Point: Sedan and the Fall of France, 1940. Stackpole Books. p. 81. .

^ Bond, Brian; Taylor, Michael D. (2001). The Battle of France and Flanders, 1940: Sixty Years on. Leo Cooper. p. 30. .

French military personnel of World War II

1879 births
1956 deaths